The Argentine Northwest (Noroeste Argentino) is a geographic and historical region of Argentina composed of the provinces of Catamarca, Jujuy, La Rioja, Salta, Santiago del Estero and Tucumán.

Geography

The Argentine Northwest comprises very distinct biomes, or geographical and climatic regions. From west to east they are:

 The Altiplano or "Puna"
 High Mountains of the Andes
 Fertile valleys
 Red-rock canyons and mountain passes
 Humid Sub-Andean Sierras
 Tropical jungles or Yungas
 And the ecotone—or transitional zone—between the Yungas and the Chaco region.

Besides the Yungas jungle on the eastern fringe of the region, the only fertile lands are those near the river basins, which have been irrigated extensively. Across millennia the erosive forces of these rivers has gradually created a multitude of red-rock canyons, such as the Quebrada de Humahuaca and the Valles Calchaquíes.

History

Archaeological finds 
In February 2021, archaeologists from the University of Buenos Aires–National Scientific and Technical Research Council announced the discovery of 12 graves dated to 6,000-1,300 years ago. Researchers also revealed necklaces and pendants next to some of the bodies. According to archaeologist Leticia Cortés, there were many kinds of burial methods, in individual or collective graves, and also in the posture of the bodies. Some were hyperflexed, like squatting, with the shoulders touching the knees.

Climate

Northwest Argentina is predominantly dry and hot and classified as subtropical. Owing to its rugged topography, the region is climatically diverse, depending on the elevation, temperature and distribution of precipitation. Consequentially, the vegetation will differ at these different climate types. In general, the climate can be divided into 2 main types: a cold arid or semi-arid climate at the higher elevations and warmer subtropical climate in the eastern parts of the region. Under the Köppen climate classification, the region has 5 different climate types which are semi–arid (BS), arid (BW), temperate climate without a dry season and with a dry season (Cf and CW respectively) and an alpine climate at the highest elevations.

The atmospheric circulation is controlled by the two semi–permanent South Atlantic and South Pacific highs, and a seasonal low-pressure system east of the Andes (called the Chaco Low). During summer, the interaction between the South Atlantic high and the Chaco low causes the low-pressure system to bring northeasterly and easterly winds that carry moisture to the region, particularly in the northern parts. The movement of moist air into the region during the summer results in very high precipitation. Most of the moisture comes from the east since the Andes block any moisture from the Pacific Ocean. Cold fronts that travel northwards to the region can produce precipitation during the summer months and is more prominent in the southern parts of the region. For example, in Tucumán Province, these cold fronts are responsible for 70% of the rainfall in that province. In contrast, during the winter months, the Chaco low attracts air masses from the South Pacific high, creating a dry and cold wind. This effect is more prominent in the winter months, when the intensity of the cold is more stronger. The Intertropical convergence zone reaches the region during the summer months, leading to low pressure, and unstable air masses due to the relatively high land temperatures compared to the sea during this season. This leads to enhanced precipitation in the form of convective thunderstorms during the summer months. During the winter months, the Intertropical Convergence Zone moves northwards to Ecuador while both the South Pacific and South Atlantic high move northwards, and the Chaco low weakens, all of which result in the suppression of rain during the winter. With the predominant wind being from the west and the Andes blocking most rain bearing clouds from the Pacific Ocean along with atmospheric circulation patterns unfavourable for rain, this results in a dry season during winter. At the highest elevations, westerly winds from the Pacific Ocean can penetrate during the winter months, leading to snowstorms.

Precipitation

Precipitation in the region is highly seasonal and is mostly concentrated in the summer months, during which precipitation decreases from east to west. Precipitation is distributed irregularly owing to relief. As moist air reaches the eastern slopes of the mountains, this moist air raises up vertically, cooling adiabatically, leading to the formation of clouds which generate copious amounts of rain. In the south, the orographic effect is enhanced by advancing cold fronts from the south, resulting in enhanced precipitation. The high rainfall on these first slopes creates a thick jungle that extends in a narrow strip along these ranges. Beyond the first slopes of the Andes into the valleys, the air descends vertically, warming adiabatically, creating air that is drier and warmer than on the eastern slopes. Since the mountain ranges are oriented in a north–south direction, increase in elevation to the west, and have a discontinuous orography, this allows valleys to have regions of relatively high precipitation in the west and drier regions in eastern parts of the valleys through orographic precipitation.

Rainfall in the Lerma valley in Salta and in wetter valleys in Jujuy province, including its provincial capital, is mainly concentrated in the summer months and falls in short but heavy bursts.

Valleys in the southern parts of the region are drier than northern valleys due to the mountains on the eastern slopes of both the Andes and the Sierras Pampeanas being taller than the ones in the north (ranging from ), presenting a significant orographic barrier that blocks moist winds from the Atlantic and Pacific oceans.

Precipitation in the Puna region averages less than  a year while potential evapotranspiration ranges from  a year, owing to the high insolation, strong winds, and low humidity that exacerbates the dry conditions. Owing to the low precipitation in conjunction with the extreme climatic conditions, the Puna region has a water deficit in all months of the year. Although easterly winds are rare in the Puna region, they bring 88–96% of the precipitation to the area. Snowfall is rare, averaging less than 5 days of snow per year since most of the precipitation falls in the summer in the form of rain. The southeast part of the Puna region is very arid and receives the lowest annual precipitation in the region, averaging . Due to the aridity of these mountains at high elevations, the snowline can extend as far up as 6,000 m above sea level. The El Niño Southern Oscillation influences precipitation levels in northwest Argentina. During an El Niño year, the westerly flow is strengthened while moisture content from the east is reduced, resulting in a drier rainy season. In contrast, during a La Niña year, there is enhanced easterly moisture transport, resulting in a more intense rainy season. Nonetheless, this trend is highly variable both spatially and temporally.

Temperatures

Temperatures in northwest Argentina vary with elevation. The diurnal range in these cities is fairly large, particularly in the winter.

A major reason for the large thermal amplitude is that during the day, there is intense radiation from the sun, causing the land to heat up while during the night, there is less radiation, causing the land to cool and temperatures to fall down. In the Calchaquí Valleys in Salta province, the climate is similar to the valleys in La Rioja province and Catamarca province, by being temperate and arid with large thermal amplitudes, long summers, and a long frost free period which varies depending on elevation. In both the Quebrada de Humahuaca and Calchaqui valleys, winters are cold with frosts that can occur between March and September.

In the valleys in the south in La Rioja province and Catamarca province along with the southwest parts of Santiago del Estero Province which is part of the arid Chaco ecoregion, the climate is mild year long in terms of temperature. Temperatures can exceed  on an average of 20–25 days and can occasionally exceed , particularly in the central valley of Catamarca (Valle Central de Catamarca) and the valley of La Rioja Capital which lie at lower elevations than other valleys such as Tinogasta. Cold fronts from the south, bringing cold Antarctic air can cause severe frosts in the valleys of La Rioja province and Catamarca province. Temperatures can fall between  during these cold fronts.

Further west, in the Puna region next to Bolivia, temperatures are much colder, with a mean annual temperature of less than  owing to its high elevation. The Puna region is characterized by being cold but sunny throughout the year. Absolute maximum temperatures in the Puna region can reach up to  while absolute minimum temperatures can fall below .

Easternmost parts of the province, which borders the Chaco region are home to the highest and lowest temperatures in the province where absolute maximum temperatures can exceed  while absolute minimum temperatures can reach close to  owing to the accumulation of cold air that descends from the mountains. At higher elevations, the climate is cooler with summer temperatures averaging  and winter temperatures averaging .

Economy
The majority of the population—and thus economic activity—of this region is concentrated in the many fertile valleys. In these valleys, the cultivation of sugarcane, tobacco, and citrus is the most important activity, along with cattle and goat raising.
Important vineyards are also found in the Valles Calchaquíes in the Cafayate region.

Thus most economic activity is associated with agriculture, with the exception of the "Altos Hornos Zapla" steel furnace.

Mining includes lithium, lead, silver, zinc and salt, and hydrocarbons extraction.

Tourism

The Argentine Northwest is a popular destination for both domestic and international travelers, attracting neighboring Argentinos and vacationing Europeans alike. Some of the most popular destination are Quebrada de Humahuaca and the Cerro de los Siete Colores, Cafayate and the Valles Calchaquíes, Tafí del Valle, and the capital cities of the provinces: San Miguel de Tucumán, San Fernando del Valle de Catamarca, Salta and San Salvador de Jujuy.

The national parks of the region are: Baritú National Park, Calilegua National Park, El Rey National Park, Los Cardones National Park and Campo de los Alisos National Park.

Cultural tourism
Besides the geography of the area, the culture is also of great interest. It is strongly influenced by Quechua and Aymara cultures, and the region is quite distinct from the more European Buenos Aires. This influence can be seen in the music, clothing and customs of the people.

See also
1948 Salta earthquake

References

Notes

Sources

External links
The Andean northwest
Argentine Northwest (Spanish)
Map with routes
Monografias.com:Argentine Northwest (Spanish)
Argentine Northwest art (Spanish)

Regions of Argentina
Back-arc basins